Polynema is a genus of fungi in the family Clavicipitaceae.

Species 
Polynema asclepiadis - Polynema aurelia - Polynema careyae - Polynema hispidulum - Polynema muirii - Polynema ornatum - Polynema perlaceum - Polynema radiatum - Polynema sinense - Polynema triaristatum - Polynema tricristatum - Polynema vitis

References

External links 
 

Hypocreales genera
Clavicipitaceae
Taxa named by Joseph-Henri Léveillé